is a professor of science and engineering in University of Tokyo, mostly in the field of physics. He was 30th president of the University of Tokyo, after succeeding Junichi Hamada who retired in 2015, and until the expiration of his term in March 2021. In 2022 he became president of Riken.
 
He works in the graduate school of science, school of engineering in the institution before being dean in graduate school of science and vice president of the university.

He holds a PhD in optical physics at University of Tokyo and most of his research based on Quantum physics and participate in Center for Quantum Materials.

He is also president of IARU, elected for two years.

Notes 

Living people
1957 births
Members of the International Alliance of Research Universities
Academic staff of the University of Tokyo
Presidents of the University of Tokyo
Japanese physicists